Jackson's Furnace Site, also known as Stroup's Furnace, is a historic archaeological site located near Smyrna, York County, South Carolina. The site includes an earthen sluiceway, stone dam abutments, the stone foundation of an iron furnace and slag heaps. It is one of only two sites that can be associated with the King's Mountain Iron Company, which operated in present-day Cherokee County from about 1815 to about 1860. The other site is King's Creek Furnace Site in Cherokee County.

It was added to the National Register of Historic Places in 1987.

References

Industrial buildings and structures on the National Register of Historic Places in South Carolina
Archaeological sites on the National Register of Historic Places in South Carolina
Industrial buildings completed in 1815
Buildings and structures in York County, South Carolina
National Register of Historic Places in York County, South Carolina
Industrial furnaces
Ironworks and steel mills in the United States